Erythrochiton is a genus of beetles in the family Cerambycidae, containing the following species:

 Erythrochiton jucundum (Gounelle, 1913)
 Erythrochiton nigrosignatum Zajciw, 1957
 Erythrochiton rubronigrum Napp & Santos, 1996
 Erythrochiton sellatum (Buquet in Guérin-Méneville, 1844)

References

Heteropsini